One Rail Australia was an Australian rail freight operator company. Founded by Genesee & Wyoming in 1997 as Australian Southern Railroad, and later renamed Genesee & Wyoming Australia, it was renamed One Rail Australia in February 2020 after the company sold its remaining shareholding. In July 2022, assets from the South Australian, Northern Territory and interstate operations of the company were sold to rail operator company Aurizon Holdings Limited. The remaining assets, relating to coal haulage in New South Wales and Queensland, were sold in February 2023 to Magnetic Rail Group.

Corporate history

Genesee & Wyoming was one of several US regional railroad companies to take advantage of the privatisation of Australian rail freight operations in the 1990s. In 1997 Genesee & Wyoming Australia acquired the South Australian rail freight assets of Australian National from the Australian federal government, which included a 50-year lease on the South Australian network from the state government. Operations commenced in November 1997 under the Australian Southern Railroad brand.

In 2000, Australian Railroad Group, a 50–50 joint venture between Genesee & Wyoming and Wesfarmers, took over the Westrail freight business in Western Australia and branded it as Australian Western Railroad. As part of the joint venture agreement, ownership of Australian Southern Railroad passed to the Australian Railroad Group. In 2002, both Australian Southern Railroad and Australian Western Railroad were brought together as the Australian Railroad Group.

In 2006, Australian Railroad Group sold its Western Australian operations to Queensland Rail and WestNet Rail. Simultaneously, Wesfarmers sold its 50% interest in the remainder of Australian Railroad Group to Genesee & Wyoming, and the business was rebranded Genesee & Wyoming Australia (GWA).

In 2010, GWA purchased the assets of FreightLink from that company's receivers and took over its operations. As a consequence, under a build–own–operate–and–transfer agreement it became the lessor of the Alice Springs to Darwin section of the Adelaide–Darwin rail corridor until 2054, when ownership was to pass to the Australian federal government. It also became the lessee (from the Australian Rail Track Corporation) of the Tarcoola to Alice Springs sector until 2047. After this acquisition, GWA became the largest of the 11 Genesee & Wyoming operating regions around the world.

After Freightliner Group was purchased by Genesee & Wyoming in 2015, Freightliner's Australian operations were integrated with those of GWA.

By 2016, GWA had been operating Glencore Rail's assets with fellow Genesee & Wyoming subsidiary Freightliner for some time under a 20-year contract. In conjunction with Macquarie Infrastructure & Real Assets, the company acquired Glencore's Hunter Valley business. Concurrently, Genesee & Wyoming acquired a 49% equity stake in GWA.

In 2019, when Genesee & Wyoming was sold to Brookfield Infrastructure Partners and GIC Private Limited, GWA was not included. Because Brookfield already had other rail assets in Australia that could well have led to the companies regulator, the Australian Competition & Consumer Commission (ACCC), to block the purchase, the 51% shareholding that Genesee & Wyoming had in GWA was sold separately to PGGM. At the same time, the company was rebranded as One Rail Australia.

Sale
In October 2021, Aurizon agreed on terms to purchase One Rail Australia. To ameliorate an expected concern of the ACCC about dilution of competition in the Hunter Valley and Queensland coal haulage market, in which the company already operated, Aurizon made a court-enforceable undertaking to divest the coal haulage part of its business. The ACCC did not oppose the company's sale, which took effect on 29 July 2022. 

Assets assigned to be divested included 51 locomotives, 1468 freight vehicles, leases to four depots and offices, and two maintenance facilities. About 400 employees transferred.

At the time of the sale, the South Australian, Northern Territory and interstate haulage operations were carrying about 10 million tonnes annually. The divested part of the business conveyed 45 million tonnes of coal annually. Its disposal was arranged by a business unit operated separately from Aurizon, with an independent board and management and an ACCC-approved independent manager. Magnetic Rail Group purchased the assets in February 2023.

The sale price of the divested assets was AUD2.35 billion.

Operational history

In 1999, Australian Railroad Group started operating services from Adelaide to Melbourne for Patrick Corporation. In that year the company also contracted with Liberty House Group to operate iron ore trains on its line from Middleback Range to Whyalla.

In 2001, the company began operating services from Adelaide to Sydney via Broken Hill and Cootamundra. In 2003, it started operating within New South Wales when it was awarded a five-year contract to haul flour, grain and starch for the Manildra Group.

Since 2004, when the Alice Springs to Darwin section of the Adelaide–Darwin rail corridor was completed, the company has run intermodal train services between Adelaide and Darwin, with freight and passenger depots owned and operated at Alice Springs, Tennant Creek, Katherine and Darwin.

In 2008, as Genesee and Wyoming Australia, the company signed a five-year deal with ABB Grain to haul grain trains in Victoria.

In 2010, when the company purchased the Alice Springs to Darwin section of the Adelaide–Darwin rail corridor and leased the Tarcoola-to-Alice Springs section, it also undertook train control for both lines.
 As of 2019, the weekly traffic on the line (in each direction) was six inter-modal, long-distance freight trains and The Ghan, an experiential tourism train.

The company's market was expanded in 2020, when a coal hauling contract was started in Queensland.

Lines operated and serviced
As of 2021, One Rail Australia leases  of  standard-gauge and  narrow-gauge track. They were in two categories, since the company owned or leased some trackage and utilised some provided by other entities; three were narrow-gauge:
 lines leased by the company, on which it provided services (described as "above and below ground"): 
– the  Tarcoola–Darwin route
– the  narrow-gauge gypsum line to Thevenard
 lines owned by other companies, on which One Rail Australia provided services (described as "above ground"): 
– the federally owned interstate main lines from Kalgoorlie to Victoria and New South Wales
– main lines owned by state government authorities, of which the lines in Queensland were narrow-gauge 
– the   narrow-gauge iron ore lines to Whyalla owned by Liberty House Group.

The adjacent map summarises rail access arrangements for lines in South Australia and the Northern Territory, which formed the initial core of the company's operations. In South Australia, under a state government lease ending in 2047, the company operated and managed the non-metropolitan railway network except for routes to other states, and made it accessible to other companies. It also managed some yards and sidings attached to the ARTC main lines.

The South Australian open-access lines served grain silos in the Murraylands –  broad gauge – and on Eyre Peninsula –  narrow gauge. Viterra, the monopoly grain handler in South Australia, progressively closed most silos adjacent to the Murraylands lines and rail haulage ended between 2002 and 2015. Viterra also chose to move to road transport on the Eyre Peninsula in 2019, resulting in the network becoming "dormant" of all other than the gypsum line from Lake MacDonnell to the port of Thevenard, adjoined to Ceduna.

Locomotive fleet
, One Rail Australia's locomotive fleet totalled 132, including 16 in storage, of 24 different classes, as shown in the following table. The table also shows the 51 locomotives of the 2200, GWA, GWN, GWU and XRN classes that were included in the assets transferred to the divestiture business at the time of One Rail Australia's sale in July 2022.

Notes

References

External links
One Rail Australia website

Freight railway companies of Australia
Genesee & Wyoming
Rail transport in South Australia
Interstate rail in Australia
Railway companies established in 1997
Railway companies disestablished in 2022
Railway infrastructure companies of Australia
1997 establishments in Australia
2022 disestablishments in Australia
2022 mergers and acquisitions